The Roxbox (Roxette 86-06) is a boxed set compilation by Swedish pop duo Roxette, released on 18 October 2006 by Roxette Recordings and Capitol. It is an expanded companion piece to the single-disc greatest hits album A Collection of Roxette Hits: Their 20 Greatest Songs!, which was also released on the same date. The box set consists of four CDs (HDCD) containing singles, album tracks, non-album singles and B-sides, as well as previously unreleased outtakes, alternate versions and demos. It also includes two DVDs: the first is of their previously unreleased 9 January 1993 performance at the Cirkus arena in Stockholm for MTV Unplugged; the second contains every music video ever recorded by the duo. In fact, it is a Dual layer (both sided) DVD.

Contents
The box set was created to celebrate twenty years since the release of Roxette's debut studio album Pearls of Passion (1986). Its spine contains the words "It was twenty years ago today...", a reference to The Beatles song "Sgt. Pepper's Lonely Hearts Club Band". In an interview on Vancouver Island's CKWV-FM ("The Wave"), Per Gessle described the box as "four CDs, some DVDs, a little bit of this, a little bit of that, outtakes and demos and stuff. It's like a coffee table thing, and it's really, really big, [with an] 80-page booklet and stuff." Its contents were compiled by Gessle, Marie Fredriksson and Kjell Andersson—a Swedish music producer and longtime executive at EMI Sweden, which was the duo's original label. The songs featured on the box set stretch back to Roxette's first single, "Neverending Love", to new songs recorded in June 2006 specifically for the compilation, "One Wish" and "Reveal". These songs were the first new tracks recorded by the duo following Fredriksson's brain tumour diagnosis in 2002.

The set omits four singles: "I Call Your Name" from Pearls of Passion, "Chances" from Look Sharp! (1988), and the single version of "Fingertips '93" (originally from 1992's Tourism), all of which received a limited release in select European territories. The only internationally-released single to be omitted from the box set is "Fireworks", from Crash! Boom! Bang! (1994). The song has never appeared on any of the duo's compilation albums. In an interview with The Daily Roxette in 2009, Gessle was asked why the song has been ignored, replying: "I guess it just wasn't big enough. There are so many other [Roxette] tracks that kick its ass. And on The Rox Box, we decided to use demos and other uplifting stuff instead." One of the DVDs, however, does include the music videos to all of these songs. The other DVD contains the duo's complete set from their 1993 MTV Unplugged concert, which had remained unreleased until this point, although three songs from the show appeared on their 1995 compilation Rarities: "Joyride", "The Look" and "Dangerous".

Critical reception

Markus Larsson of Swedish publication Aftonbladet was critical of the box set's length, but praised the duo's songwriting and vocal performances, particularly on the first two CDs, writing: "Even Satan knows the melodies Per Gessle wrote during Roxette's peak, they were the most irresistible blend of hooks and power-pop. And let's not forget Miss Marie's delectable vocals, which illuminated every single hit. Together, they were the bastard lovechild of ABBA and Ramones. It's no wonder sales figures were so breathtaking."

Track listing
All songs written by Per Gessle and produced by Clarence Öfwerman, except where noted.

Notes
 signifies a co-producer.

Charts

References

External links

2006 compilation albums
Roxette compilation albums